On November 27, 2015, a mass shooting occurred in a Planned Parenthood clinic in Colorado Springs, Colorado, resulting in the deaths of three people and injuries to nine. A police officer and two civilians were killed; five police officers and four civilians were injured. After a standoff that lasted five hours, police SWAT teams crashed armored vehicles into the lobby and the attacker surrendered.

The attacker, Robert Lewis Dear Jr., was arrested, charged in state court with first-degree murder, and ordered held without bond. At court appearances, Dear repeatedly interrupted proceedings, made statements affirming his guilt (although he did not enter a formal plea), and expressed anti-abortion and anti-Planned Parenthood views, calling himself "a warrior for the babies." He also asserted his desire to act as his own attorney in the criminal case against him. Subsequent mental competency evaluations ordered by the state court determined Dear to be delusional. The judge presiding over the state case ruled in May 2016 that Dear was incompetent to stand trial and ordered him indefinitely confined to a Colorado state mental hospital, where he has remained ever since. In 2018, the court ruled that Dear remains incompetent to stand trial. In December 2019, separate federal charges were brought against Dear.

The incident drew comments from the anti-abortion and abortion-rights movements, as well as political leaders. This was the second of two shootings in Colorado Springs in less than a month; the first occurred 28 days earlier.

Event

Shooting 
Law enforcement responded to a report of an active shooter inside the Planned Parenthood clinic at approximately 11:38 a.m. MST. Staff inside the clinic said they heard the gunfire outside and then moved people out of the waiting room and locked a security door.

As responding officers approached the building, the suspect fired at them, hitting several and killing one. Police returned fire and a five-hour standoff then ensued. Initial reports described the gunman as being armed with a long gun and wearing hunting gear. Authorities later identified the weapon as a semi-automatic rifle. An eyewitness in the parking lot described a man with a "cold, stone face" as he began firing and pursued a crawling man through the parking lot and into the clinic. Another described a man with "holes in his chest" stagger into a nearby grocery store a few minutes later, saying he had been shot in the parking lot between Planned Parenthood and the store.

As many as twenty gunshots were fired within five minutes. Police swarmed the area, and nearby stores were put on lockdown.

Standoff and arrest 
During the standoff, officers who made it inside the clinic traded fire with the suspect.  Police SWAT teams crashed a Bear armored vehicle into the lobby, smashing two sets of doors and rescuing some of those trapped inside. The gunman subsequently surrendered and was taken into custody at 4:52 p.m. Following the apprehension of the gunman, law enforcement began searching the building, as well as the gunman's car, for possible explosives. Multiple propane tanks were found near the suspect's car, and authorities said they believed that he planned to fire on the tanks to trigger an explosion. At 9:10 p.m. the gunman was identified as Robert Lewis Dear Jr., a 57-year-old man from North Carolina.

The Federal Bureau of Investigation and the Bureau of Alcohol, Tobacco, Firearms and Explosives were called to assist in the investigation, and President Barack Obama was briefed on the incident.  As a precautionary response to the shooting, additional law enforcement personnel were assigned to Planned Parenthood clinics in New York City and Denver.

Victims 
Three individuals were killed in the shooting: University of Colorado Colorado Springs police officer Garrett Swasey, 44, who responded to the shooting; Ke'Arre M. Stewart, 29, who ran back to the clinic to warn others after being shot; and Jennifer Markovsky, 35, who was accompanying a friend to the clinic. Nine other victims—five police officers and four civilians—were shot and admitted to local hospitals.

Perpetrator 

Robert Lewis Dear Jr. (born April 16, 1958), aged 57 at the time of his arrest, was born in Charleston, South Carolina and grew up in Louisville, Kentucky.

Dear spent most of his life in the Carolinas. He worked as an independent art dealer and lived in a succession of trailers and cabins before moving to Colorado in 2014. He was living in a trailer in Hartsel at the time of the shooting.

In May 1991, Dear was arrested and convicted in Charleston, for the unlawful carrying of a "long blade knife" and illegal possession of a loaded gun. A woman who was married to Dear from 1985 to 1993 told NBC News that Dear had targeted a Planned Parenthood clinic before, by putting glue on its locks, and had a history of violent behavior. In the court document for their 1993 divorce, his ex-wife said, "He claims to be a Christian and is extremely evangelistic, but does not follow the Bible in his actions. He says that as long as he believes he will be saved, he can do whatever he pleases. He is obsessed with the world coming to an end." Dear wrote on a marijuana Internet forum: "Turn to JESUS or burn in hell [...] WAKE UP SINNERS U CANT SAVE YOURSELF U WILL DIE AN WORMS SHALL EAT YOUR FLESH, NOW YOUR SOUL IS GOING SOMEWHERE." He also posted notes on the same forum describing his own marijuana usage and stating that he was looking for women to "party" with.

The New York Times also reported that "[a] number of people who knew Mr. Dear said he was a staunch abortion opponent", that "[o]ne person who spoke with him extensively about his religious views said [that] Mr. Dear [...] had praised people who attacked abortion providers, saying they were doing 'God's work'", and that "[i]n 2009, [...] Mr. Dear described as 'heroes' members of the Army of God, a loosely organized group of anti-abortion extremists that has claimed responsibility for a number of killings and bombings."

Dear's former wife said he was deeply religious, but conflicted, and that he likely targeted the clinic because of its abortion-related activities.

Investigation 
Police said on November 29 that the warrants related to the case against Dear have been sealed because the investigation was active, and that consequently information about the timeline of events, the suspect's motive, and the weapon used would not be released "at this time." According to an unnamed senior law enforcement official, first quoted by NBC News, Dear gave a "rambling" interview after his arrest in which he said at one point, "No more baby parts"—a statement that has been seen as a reference to the Planned Parenthood 2015 undercover videos controversy. The unnamed official added that Dear "said a lot of things" in his police interview indicating that the shootings were "definitely politically motivated," and that in the interview Dear had expressed anti-abortion and anti-government views. Dear is also alleged to have made statements about President Barack Obama in the course of events, prompting the U.S. Secret Service to dispatch agents to evaluate the remarks and interview him.

According to an official close to the investigation, Dear asked at least one person for directions to the Planned Parenthood facility before the shooting, which, according to NBC News offered "the clearest suggestion yet that he was targeting the reproductive health organization."

Legal proceedings

State charges
On November 30, 2015, Dear was charged with first-degree murder and appeared in court (via video from the El Paso County Jail) and was ordered held without bond. If convicted, he would face either life in prison or the death penalty (although Colorado abolished the death penalty in 2020, the legislation was not retroactive). Dear was appointed a public defender: Daniel King, the same attorney who represented James Eagan Holmes, the convicted perpetrator of the 2012 Aurora, Colorado shooting. At the request of prosecutors, the judge ordered the sealing of court documents related to the investigation.

The case was brought in Colorado's Fourth Judicial District before Judge Gilbert Anthony Martinez. Appearing in court on December 9 to be formally charged with 179 felony counts, including first-degree murder, Dear interrupted proceedings more than a dozen times, yelling: "I am guilty, there's no trial. I'm a warrior for the babies," later adding "Protect the babies!" Dear stated "Kill the babies, that's what Planned Parenthood does" and accused his public defenders of conspiring with Planned Parenthood against him. The New York Times reported that Dear's "angry outbursts, declarations of guilt and expressions of anti-abortion politics ... seemed to remove any doubt about his motivation."

At the hearing, Dear also said: "You're not my lawyer" and "I will not meet with him again" and said "I'm not going to agree to mental health evaluations so they can't put me on psychotropic drugs so I can't talk like the Batman guy"—a reference to Holmes.

At a hearing in December 2015, Dear attempted to fire his public defender, telling the court: "I invoke my constitutional right to defend myself." Judge Martinez ordered Dear to undergo a mental competency evaluation at a state mental hospital to determine whether he is sufficiently competent to make the decision to represent himself.

At a hearing in March 2016, Judge Martinez set a competency hearing for the following month, and Dear's counsel the judge to send his client to the Colorado Mental Health Institute at Pueblo, the state mental hospital where the evaluation was done. In May 2016, Judge Martinez ruled that Dear was incompetent to stand trial, citing experts' finding that Dear has a "delusional disorder, persecutory type." Martinez ordered Dear to be indefinitely confined to a Colorado state mental hospital. In February 2018, following further evaluations by state psychiatrists, the judge ruled that Dear remains incompetent to stand trial, meaning that the prosecution remains on hold indefinitely.

Federal charges
In early December 2019, a federal grand jury issued a 68-count indictment against Dear: 65 counts of violating the Freedom of Access to Clinic Entrances Act (FACE Act) and three counts of using a firearm to murder. Dear was taken into custody Monday at the Colorado State Mental Health Institute in Pueblo, Colorado, where he has been detained since a state court declared him mentally incompetent to face trial on state charges in May 2016. At a plea hearing, Dear, who has admitted to being the shooter, again made several outbursts, again insisted that he was competent to stand trial, and complained about being held "at the nuthouse for four years." Federal prosecutors requested that Dear undergo a new competency evaluation.

Reaction 
Vicki Cowart, president of Planned Parenthood of the Rocky Mountains, decried the incident as a form of domestic terrorism. While the shooting was still ongoing, Republican Representative Adam Kinzinger demanded that Cowart apologize if the perpetrator was not anti-abortion.

U.S. Attorney General Loretta Lynch called the shooting "not only a crime against the Colorado Springs community, but a crime against women receiving healthcare services at Planned Parenthood, law enforcement seeking to protect and serve, and other innocent people." President Barack Obama released a statement on November 28, 2015, that stressed stricter gun control legislation.

Some U.S. politicians and groups described the shooting as domestic terrorism, including Colorado Springs Mayor John Suthers, NARAL Pro-Choice Texas, and former Republican Arkansas governor Mike Huckabee.

Colorado governor John Hickenlooper said the shooting was "a form of terrorism" and said that it and other violent incidents may be the result of the "inflammatory rhetoric we see on all levels"—referring to heated debate over abortion in the U.S.

Vicki Saporta, president of the National Abortion Federation, drew particular attention to the undercover Planned Parenthood videos, two of which were shot at a clinic in Denver, 75 miles north of Colorado Springs; these videos resulted in a number of threats against one doctor featured in the videos.

The FBI issued a statement to law enforcement agencies in September 2015 warning that Planned Parenthood facilities may require protection from arson attacks from "the pro-life extremist movement". After the shooting, some police departments placed emergency response vehicles in the vicinity of Planned Parenthood clinics.

See also
 List of right-wing terrorist attacks
 Anti-abortion violence
 Domestic terrorism in the United States
 List of shootings in Colorado
 List of rampage killers (religious, political, or ethnic crimes)

References 

2015 active shooter incidents in the United States
2015 in Colorado
2015 mass shootings in the United States
2015 murders in the United States
Anti-abortion violence in the United States
Attacks on Planned Parenthood facilities
Christian terrorism in the United States
Deaths by firearm in Colorado
History of Colorado Springs, Colorado
Mass murder in Colorado
Mass murder in the United States
Mass shootings in Colorado
Mass shootings in the United States
November 2015 crimes in the United States
Political violence in the United States
Terrorist incidents in Colorado
Terrorist incidents in the United States in 2015